Worldcom Public Relations Group is an international network of independently owned public relations firms, with 112 integrated communications agencies in 35 countries.

The group was established in 1988, to allow independent firms to serve national and multi-national clients while maintaining the service characteristic of independent agencies. Partner agencies must pass WORLDCOM benchmarks in areas including client services, financial operations, business and human resource management and partnership cooperation.

Co-operation between partners is fostered by the exchange of knowledge and experience at meetings on international and regional level. The Group is governed by an elected board of directors and three regional boards with the support of a chief operating officer.

The network also conducts continuing education for partner firms through web conferencing and its Worldcom University workshops.

In 2002 Worldcom PR Group was often mistaken for the MCI Worldcom telecom company that filed Chapter 11 Bankruptcy. Principals of the network of independent PR firms maintained that the incident was inconvenient, but that they would not change the name of their group.

References

External links 
 Worldcom Home Page

Public relations companies